Uganda competed at the inaugural Winter Paralympic Games in 1976 in Örnsköldsvik, Sweden.

Background 
Uganda was the only African country to take part in the 1976 Games, and thus the first African country ever to compete at the Winter Paralympics. Uganda was also the only country to compete at the 1976 Winter Paralympics but not at the 1976 Winter Olympics.

Team 
Uganda entered only one athlete, Tofiri Kibuuka, who competed in cross-country skiing. He did not win any medals. Kibuuka would later change nationalities, and go on to represent Norway at the Summer Paralympics at the 1984, 1988 and 1992 Games.

Cross-country skiing 

Uganda's sole representative, Tofiri Kibuuka, competed in two events.
 In the Men's short distance 10 km (category A), he finished 16th (out of 28), with a time of 58:24.
 In the Men's middle distance 15 km (category A), he finished 10th (out of 25), with a time of 1:16:32.

References

External links
International Paralympic Committee official website

Nations at the 1976 Winter Paralympics
1976
Paralympics